Plymouth (formerly, Puckerville, Pokerville, and Poker Camp) is a city in Amador County, California, United States. The population was 1,005 at the 2010 census. The town was originally named Pokerville, when it was settled during the time of the gold rush. Plymouth is commonly now known as a "Gateway to Shenandoah Valley", a popular wine-producing region in the Sierra foothills. The Ione Band of Miwok Indians, a federally recognized tribe of Miwok people, is headquartered in Plymouth.

Geography 

Plymouth is located at 

History
A post office was opened in 1871. The city incorporated in 1917.

Climate
According to the Köppen Climate Classification system, Plymouth has a warm-summer Mediterranean climate, abbreviated "Csa" on climate maps.

Demographics

2010 

At the 2010 census Plymouth had a population of 1,005. The racial makeup of Plymouth was 850 (84.6%) White, three (0.3%) African American, 18 (1.8%) Native American, six (0.6%) Asian, two (0.2%) Pacific Islander, 70 (7.0%) from other races, and 56 (5.6%) from two or more races. Hispanic or Latino of any race were 183 people (18.2%).

The census reported that 996 people (99.1% of the population) lived in households, nine (0.9%) lived in non-institutionalized group quarters, and no one was institutionalized.

There were 403 households, 130 (32.3%) had children under the age of 18 living in them, 185 (45.9%) were opposite-sex married couples living together, 41 (10.2%) had a female householder with no husband present, 23 (5.7%) had a male householder with no wife present.  There were 28 (6.9%) unmarried opposite-sex partnerships, and two (0.5%) same-sex married couples or partnerships. 119 households (29.5%) were one person and 56 (13.9%) had someone living alone who was 65 or older. The average household size was 2.47.  There were 249 families (61.8% of households); the average family size was 3.14.

The age distribution was 238 people (23.7%) under the age of 18, 75 people (7.5%) aged 18 to 24, 247 people (24.6%) aged 25 to 44, 290 people (28.9%) aged 45 to 64, and 155 people (15.4%) who were 65 or older.  The median age was 40.1 years. For every 100 females, there were 85.1 males.  For every 100 females age 18 and over, there were 87.1 males.

There were 493 housing units at an average density of ,of which 403 were occupied, 259 (64.3%) by the owners and 144 (35.7%) by renters.  The homeowner vacancy rate was 4.0 percent; the rental vacancy rate was 12.0 percent.  634 people (63.1% of the population) lived in owner-occupied housing units and 362 people (36.0%) lived in rental housing units.

2000
At the 2000 census there were 980 people in 392 households, including 272 families, in the city. The racial makeup of the city was 90.51% White, 0.20% Black or African American, 2.24% Native American, 1.12% Asian, 1.43% from other races, and 4.49% from two or more races.  5.10% of the population were Hispanic or Latino of any race.
Of the 392 households 36.2% had children under the age of 18 living with them, 48.2% were married couples living together, 17.6% had a female householder with no husband present, and 30.6% were non-families. 25.8% of households were one person and 13.5% were one person aged 65 or older.  The average household size was 2.50 and the average family size was 2.99.

The age distribution was 29.3% under the age of 18, 5.2% from 18 to 24, 26.2% from 25 to 44, 22.4% from 45 to 64, and 16.8% 65 or older.  The median age was 39 years. For every 100 females, there were 84.2 males.  For every 100 females age 18 and over, there were 78.1 males.

The median income for a household in the city was $37,262, and the median family income  was $43,611. Males had a median income of $32,411 versus $23,875 for females. The per capita income for the city was $16,197.  About 9.3% of families and 10.4% of the population were below the poverty line, including 14.5% of those under age 18 and 8.5% of those age 65 or over.

References

External links
 
 Historic Hwy 49.com: Plymouth, California

Cities in Amador County, California
Incorporated cities and towns in California
Mining communities of the California Gold Rush
Populated places established in 1853
1853 establishments in California